Haima may refer to:

 Haima Automobile, a Chinese automobile manufacturer based in Haikou, Hainan
 Haima, Oman, a town in central Oman
 Tropical Storm Haima, tropical cyclones in the Pacific Ocean